M. P. M. Ahammed "Bapu" Kurikkal (1921 - 1968) was an Indian politician and social worker who served as the Minister for Local Self Governments in Kerala Government from 1967 to 1968. He conceived the creation of the Malappuram District in central Kerala in the late 1960s.

He was the Indian Union Muslim League representative to the Kerala Legislative Assembly from Kondotty (1957 and 1960) and Malappuram (1967). Along with C. H. Mohammed Koya, Kurikkal was the first two Indian Union Muslim League ministers in Kerala Government (1967- 69 Namboodiripad Ministry).

Kurikkal died in October, 1968 while serving as the Minister of Panchayat and Community Development in the 1967- 69 Namboodiripad Ministry (United Front Government). He was succeeded by K. Avukaderkutty Naha (who oversaw the creation of the Malappuram District in 1969).

References 

Indian Union Muslim League politicians
1921 births
1968 deaths
Kerala MLAs 1957–1959
Kerala MLAs 1960–1964
Kerala MLAs 1967–1970